Masondo is a South African surname. Notable people with the surname include:

Amos Masondo (born 1953), South African politician
David Masondo (born 1974), South African politician
Sizwe Masondo (born 1987), South African cricketer 
Vusumuzi Masondo (born 1957), South African military commander
 David Masondo (1950 - July 5, 2015), was South African singer and drummer 

Bantu-language surnames